Adorabili e bugiarde (also known as Adorable and a Liar) is a 1958 Italian comedy film directed by Nunzio Malasomma.

Plot

Three beautiful girls, a model, a journalist and a painter, eager for celebrity at all costs, decide to stage a fake murder to attract the attention of the press. At some point, one of them really disappears, being found only after many vicissitudes. The three young women understand that it is better to live a quiet life far from the spotlight.

Cast 
Isabelle Corey: Anna Pelti   
Ingeborg Schöner: Paola Brini
Eloisa Cianni: Marisa Dalli   
Franco Fabrizi: Geronti   
Paolo Ferrari: Carlo   
Nino Manfredi: Mario   
Rick Battaglia: Giorgio Pitagora   
Roberto Risso: Gino Gorni   
Franco Silva: police commissioner 
Loris Gizzi: court clerk   
Enrico Glori: Donatello   
Carlo Tamberlani: chief editor   
Lauro Gazzolo: president of the tribunal 
Edoardo Toniolo: instruction judge 
Manlio Busoni: public attorney
Carlo Delle Piane: Nasone   
Nando Bruno: concierge  
Anita Durante: concierge's wife  
Giacomo Furia: Primo Fiorenzi   
Franco Giacobini: assistente costumista

References

External links

1958 films
Films directed by Nunzio Malasomma
1950s adventure comedy films
Italian adventure comedy films
1950s Italian-language films
1950s Italian films